Gyula Ortutay (24 March 1910 – 22 March 1978) was a Hungarian ethnographer and politician, who served as Minister of Religion and Education between 1947 and 1950.

Biography

Early life
Born in Szabadka (now: Subotica, Serbia) to a Catholic petty bourgeois family. His parents were István Ortutay journalist, editor of the Szegedi Napló and Ilona Borsodi. He finished his secondary school studies at the piarists in Szeged. After that he attended the Franz Joseph University from 1928. His psychology teacher was Hildebrand Dezső Várkonyi. Soon he was making left-wing friends such as Miklós Radnóti, Gábor Tolnai, Dezső Baróti, Ferenc Erdei, György Buday and Viola Tomori.

He married Zsuzsa Kemény, who served as chairperson of the Hungarian Dance Association from 1948, in 1938. They have three children: Mária (psychologist), Tamás (ceramist) and Zsuzsanna (district nurse).

Political career
He got into contact with the communist intellectuals (László Orbán, Gyula Kállai, Ferenc Hont) in the end of the 1930s. but Endre Bajcsy-Zsilinszky had the largest effect on him. From 1942 he participated in the antifascist movements. In the next year he joined the Independent Smallholders, Agrarian Workers and Civic Party (FKGP). He was Secretary-General of the National Council of The People's Patriotic Front.

References
 Magyar Életrajzi Lexikon

See also
2043 Ortutay

1910 births
1978 deaths
Politicians from Subotica
Independent Smallholders, Agrarian Workers and Civic Party politicians
Education ministers of Hungary
Members of the National Assembly of Hungary (1945–1947)
Members of the National Assembly of Hungary (1947–1949)
Members of the National Assembly of Hungary (1949–1953)
Members of the National Assembly of Hungary (1958–1963)
Members of the National Assembly of Hungary (1963–1967)
Members of the National Assembly of Hungary (1967–1971)
Members of the National Assembly of Hungary (1971–1975)
Members of the National Assembly of Hungary (1975–1980)
Hungarian ethnographers
Franz Joseph University alumni
Herder Prize recipients